Penjara Football Club is a Malaysian football club based in Kajang, Selangor, Malaysia. They currently play in the fourth-tier division in Malaysian football, the Shah Amateur League.

They have recently played in the third-tier division in Malaysian football, the Malaysia FAM League from 2015 until 2017.

The team was established as part of Malaysian Prison Department Sports Council. The Prisons were first known to play football sometime in the 1950s. However, not many records are kept or known.

Players

First-team squad

Coaches

Management team

Club personnel

 Manager: Nordin Muhammad
 Assistant Manager: Shahrul Nizam Hussain
 Head coach: Roslan Othman
 Assistant head coach: Abdul Razak Abdullah
 Fitness Coach: Noor Muhammad Arif Zainuddin
 Goalkeeping coach: Mohd Tarmizie Abdul Rahim
 Head Physio: Nurul Hisyam Azmi
 Asst Physio: Abdul Jalil Ahmad

Honours
Malaysia FAM League
  Champion(3) :1970,1971,1973

PBNS M5 League
  Champion(1) : 2018

Notable former players
 Namat Abdullah
 Shaharuddin Abdullah
 Syed Ahmad Syed Abu Bakar

References

External links
 Official Facebook Page
 Penjara FC Soccerway

Malaysia FAM League clubs
Football clubs in Malaysia
1970 establishments in Malaysia
Football associations in Malaysia
Malaysia M3 League